Debak is a small city in Malaysia, which prior to 2022 was a small district. This is because Debak is a rapidly developing urbanization area which is located on a very strategic route in the middle of a busy trade route, connecting directly to the Pan Borneo Highway. Not only that, the availability of petrol stations near the same route accelerates the process of urbanization and internal and external migration in Debak, which at the same time has increased the population in Debak District.

In addition, the area in the direction of Sarikei, Sarawak can also shorten the travel distance to Betong with the shortcut through the Debak District. This logistical reach has attracted many offers of socio-economic activities in Debak and the surrounding areas also benefit together.

Besides that, the socio-economic vibrancy in Debak is not only influenced by the road factor. The positive impact of income growth in the Debak District is also due to the existence of water connections, especially the Rimbas River that flows through the center of Debak and Di Tebingan. The waterfront acts as a catalytic element of Debak's economy. This is because, in addition to trade activities, and professional economic activities, Debak's progress is also driven by factors of conventional economic activities such as agriculture that involve some of the residents of Debak and the surrounding areas. Conventional agricultural activities previously labeled as the main pillar of income in Debak are now increasingly shifting to a much more modern agricultural paradigm. According to the times, almost 75% of the people in Debak District are now players in the professional sector such as in the Government sector, the Private sector and many in among them are big businessmen in major cities in Sarawak.

History
It is not known when Debak was established. In the early 1980s, a fire razed the main bazaar. The present bazaar was built in 1989.

Settlement

Debak District is one of several administrative districts in Sarawak. Debak district includes several settlements that consist of several villages in it as follows:

 Kampung Lalang, Debak
 Tuie Village, Debak
 Debak Laut Village
 Debak Town
 Babu Village, Debak
 Bungey Village, Debak
 Long Houses in Ulu Rimbas
 Muton Area
 Kampung Dit
 Dit Long Houses
 Kampung Serembang, Debak
 Bungin Village, Debak
 Suri Area, Debak
 Mayor Hamid's village, Debak
 Kampung Suri, Debak

References

External links
 Debak history

Towns in Sarawak